Keough Hot Springs is located in the Owens Valley of California, about seven miles south of the city of Bishop on US Highway 395.

History 
The area around this hot springs was originally inhabited by the local native Paiutes, who considered the waters sacred.  Today there is a very small community of homes, and a commercial resort featuring a large swimming pool which was built and first opened in August 1918 by Philip P. Keough, a former local superintendent of the Wells Fargo stage company.  Keough's resort was very popular in the 1920s and 30's and was designed to be a complete health resort.  The resort reportedly continued to be a very popular social gathering site for residents of the nearby communities up until the World War II era.

In 1926 the City of Los Angeles purchased the property as a part of its famous water-rights land grab in the Owens Valley.  The City's Water and Power Department allowed the resort to remain open under its direction, but absentee management led to a decline in the resort's viability.  Leases were offered to various operators, but with only a five-year term.  The pool was closed to the public in 1934, but was reopened a few years later by another operator. A new lessee in 1955 performed renovations and the pool once again regained its vitality as a public swimming and recreation area until insurance considerations dictated that it become a membership-only club in 1985.

Sources

Hot springs of California
Bodies of water of Inyo County, California
Buildings and structures in Inyo County, California
Tourist attractions in Inyo County, California